The Dublin Corporation Wholesale Markets (laterly the Dublin City Fruit and Vegetable Market) is a market located in the Smithfield area of Dublin in existence from the 6 December 1892 until its closure in 2019. At that point, legacy tenants received compensation and vacated the space to alternative premises to facilitate refurbishments and reopening as a retail and food focused market. In the months following the closure of the market, the onset of COVID-19 resulted in the suspension of the project and the temporary usage of the market to store building materials for nearby construction projects.

The original market was constructed along with an adjacent fish market. This was demolished in the early 2000s and now operates as a car park.

As of 2022, Dublin City Council still intends to re-open the market as a mixed wholesale, retail, fruit and vegetable market with the Time Out Market Lisboa and Borough Market often cited as operating models.

Building
The building was constructed mainly in red brick with some yellow brick lining while the roof is supported by a cast iron frame. The pilasters and elements around the doors and arches such as pediments are from carved limestone while the base of some of the doorways and pillars are made in harder granite to avoid the wear and tear which came with day-to-day market use. Various pieces of terracotta statuary around the arches and doors reference produce traded at the market such as fish, fruit, vegetables and flowers.

See also
Iveagh Markets

References

Tourist attractions in the Republic of Ireland
Markets in Dublin (city)
Market halls